Milo (/mɪloʊ/; MYLOO) is a masculine given name and a surname. The name Milo is derived from multiple sources. In the Slavic languages, the root mil- means "dear" or "beloved," and the name may have come from a Latinized form of this root. However, it is also believed that the name may derive from the Latin word "miles," meaning "soldier". It is also believed that the word comes from the ancient Greek "milos," which means "of the yew-flower". The name also bears Germanic and Gothic origins, with the word "milo," meaning "the great merciful".

The name Milo has documented usage as far back as the  ancient Greece. It was first brought into use in the English language after the Norman Conquest in the 11th-century AD.

The names: Milos, Mylo, Milós, Miklós, Miles, Miilo and Miloš are all variants derived from the name. Whilst the feminine equivalents to the name Milo is either Mila or Myla.    

Milo the Great

Name statistics 
In 2020 it ranked as the 134th most popular boys name in the United States.

People

Single name
 Milo of Croton, 6th-century BC ancient Greek wrestler
 Milo (bishop of Trier) (died 762 or 763), Archbishop of Reims and of Trier
 Milo the Great (died 1102),  Lord of Montlhéry
 Milo (footballer) (born 1990), Egyptian footballer Islam Mohamed Ramadan Rashd
 Milo (musician) (born 1992), former stage name of American hip hop musician now known as R.A.P. Ferreira

Given name
 Milo M. Acker (1853–1922), New York politician
 Milo Aukerman (born 1963), American biochemist and lead singer of the punk rock band the Descendents
 Milo Samuel Baker (1868–1961), American botanist
 Milo Butler (1906–1979), first Bahamian governor-general
 Milo Cawthorne (born 1989), New Zealand actor
 Milo Cipra (1906–1985), Croatian composer
 Milo Colton (born 1943), American politician
 Milo de Angelis (born 1951), Italian language poet
 Milo Dor (1923–2005), Serbian-Austrian author 
 Milo Duçi (1870–1933), Albanian publisher, playwright, and entrepreneur
 Milo Đukanović (born 1962), former Prime Minister and current President of Montenegro
 Milo Eifler (born 1998), American football player
 Milo Gibson (born 1990), American actor
 Milo Emil Halbheer (1910–1978), German painter
 Milo Hamilton (1927–2015), American sportscaster
 Milo Hrnić (born 1950), Croatian pop singer
 Milo Manara (born 1945), Italian artist
 Milo Manheim (born 2001), American actor
 Milo Milunović (1897–1967), Yugoslav and Montenegrin painter
 Milo Moiré (born 1983), Swiss artist
 Milo A. Root (1863–1917), justice of the Washington Supreme Court
 Milo O'Shea (1926–2013), Irish actor
 Milo Parker (born 2002), English actor
 Milo Petrović-Njegoš (1889–1978), prince of Montenegro
 Milo Radulovich (1926–2007), American US Air Force reserve accused of having Communist sympathies
 Milo Rau (born 1977), Swiss theater director
 Milo Ventimiglia (born 1977), American film actor
 Milo Yiannopoulos (born 1983), British media personality

Surname
 Candi Milo (born 1961), American voice actress
 Leon Milo (1956–2014), American composer, percussionist and sound artist
 Luciano Milo (born 1980), Italian figure skater
 Roni Milo (born 1949), Israeli politician and 10th mayor of Tel Aviv
 Sandra Milo (born 1933), Italian actress
Titus Annius Milo, 1st century BCE Roman politician

Places
 Milos, island that is a part of the Aegean Islands of Greece

Fictional characters
 Milo Bloom, in Berkeley Breathed's comic strip Bloom County
 Milo Kerrigan, in the Australian television series Full Frontal
 Milo Minderbinder, in Joseph Heller's novels Catch-22 and Closing Time
 Frank Milo, played by Bill Murray in the 1993 American crime comedy-drama movie Mad Dog and Glory
 Milo Murphy, from Milo Murphy's Law, an American animated television series
 Milo Powell, the protagonist of the Canadian-Filipino animated series Captain Flamingo
 Milo Pressman, in the American television series 24
 Milo Rambaldi, in the American television series Alias
 Milo Standish, in Brothers, a 1986 novel by William Goldman
 Milo James Thatch, the protagonist of the Disney film Atlantis: The Lost Empire
 Milo Tindle, the lover of Andrew Wyke's wife in Sleuth, the 1970 play by Anthony Shaffer; played by Michel Caine in the 1972 film
 Milo, the protagonist of the 1961 children's adventure novel The Phantom Tollbooth
 Milo, in the animated television series Fish Hooks
 Milo, the purple-skinned character in the children's television show Tweenies
 Professor Milo, an enemy of Batman in the DC Comics universe

See also

 Milović
 Mito (name)
 Mylo (disambiguation)

English masculine given names
German masculine given names
Italian masculine given names
Masculine given names
Portuguese masculine given names
Slavic masculine given names
Spanish masculine given names